1 Billion Views is the first studio album by duo Exo-SC, the second official sub-unit of South Korean–Chinese boy group Exo. It was released on July 13, 2020, by SM Entertainment, and features nine tracks. The album debuted at number one on the Gaon Album Chart, and was the duo's first top-ten entry on the Oricon Albums Chart, peaking at number ten in its first week.

To promote the album, "Telephone" was released as a pre-release single on July 7, 2020, while the eponymous title track served as the second single on July 13, 2020. The latter earned the duo their first top-thirty entry on the Gaon Digital Chart since their debut.

Background and release
On June 9, SM confirmed that EXO-SC were preparing to release a new album in July. On June 23, the album's release date and title were announced along with a teaser image of the digital cover.

On July 1, a teaser image of the album's track list and schedule was released. On July 2, five teaser images of Chanyeol were released, with another five images of Sehun released the next day. On July 3, it was reported that the duo participated in writing the lyrics of every song on the album and helped compose the tracks "Telephone", "Fly Away" and "On Me". On July 4, five teaser images of both Sehun and Chanyeol were released. On July 6, teaser images of the duo both together and individually were released. On the same day, it was reported that the album features two solo tracks: "Nothin'", sung by Chanyeol and "On Me", sung by Sehun. On July 7, two teaser images of the duo were released. On the same day, "Telephone" featuring 10cm was released digitally along with a music video. On July 8, teaser images of both members were released, along with the music video for "Nothin'", a solo track by Chanyeol. On July 9, the music video for Sehun's solo track "On Me" was released. On July 12, "1 Billion Views" music video teaser was released. On July 13, the album was officially released along with "1 Billion Views" music video.

Composition and production
The album opens with the titular "1 Billion Views", a trendy hip hop song with a funky guitar sound and addictive disco rhythm. Featuring fellow singer Moon, the song finds the duo "wanting to see one's loved one" by playing their video repeatedly. The second track "Say It", featuring Penomeco (who also co-wrote the lyrics), is described as a hip hop song that combines a heavy 808 base and bossa nova rhythm in order to "feel the summer vibe".

"Telephone", featuring 10cm, is described as hip hop song with a cheerful piano riff and a heavy bass beat.

"Fly away", featuring Gaeko who also participated in composing the song, is described as an r&b hip-hop song based on sentimental lyrical band sounds.

"Nothin'", Chanyeol's solo song, in which he participated in both writing and composing, is described as a hip hop R&B song with a harmony between the dreamy vibe electric guitar sounds and the heavy beats. The lyrics are about one's determination to go on their own way silently and without paying attention to the surroundings.

"On Me", Sehun's solo, in which he participated in both writing and composing, is described as a trap hip hop song with a rhythmical bass & strong synthesizer. The lyrics contain a message of "I'll do my best in every present moment".

"Rodeo Station" is a hip hop song which combines simple guitar riffs and casual beats. In the lyrics, Sehun and Chanyeol look back on their past and present lives and recalling the scenery around Apgujeong Rodeo Station during their trainee days.

"Jet Lag" is a charming R&B hip hop song with a lyrical guitar performance with lyrics about the main character who's in a relationship where they can't meet their loved one easily, and both parts feel like their love is growing apart because of the time they spend away from each other.

Track listing

Charts

Accolades

Music program awards

Sales

Certifications

Release history

See also
 List of Gaon Album Chart number ones of 2020

References

2020 debut albums
SM Entertainment albums
Korean-language albums
IRiver albums